Cancilla fibula is a species of sea snail, a marine gastropod mollusk in the family Mitridae, the miters or miter snails.

Description
The length of the shell varies between 36 mm and 44 mm.

Distribution
This marine species occurs off the Philippines.

References

 Salisbury R. & Huang S.-I. (2015). Notes on Cancilla isabella (Swainson, 1831) (Neogastropoda: Mitridae) with emphasis on the radula and generic assignment within Mitridae. Visaya. 4(4): 29-41

External links
 Gastropods.com: Cancilla fibula

Mitridae
Gastropods described in 2009